Christopher Phillip Langridge (born 2 May 1985) is a retired British badminton player. He competed for England at the 2014 Commonwealth Games where he won three medals. He represented Great Britain at the 2016 Summer Olympics, and won a bronze medal in the men's doubles, partnered with Marcus Ellis. They also won gold medals at the 2018 Commonwealth Games and 2019 European Games.

Early life and education 
Chris Langridge was born on 2 May 1985 in Epsom, Surrey.

Langridge was educated at Therfield School, a state comprehensive school in the town of Leatherhead in Surrey in southern England. The school were twice National Schools champions.  Langridge was introduced to badminton when he was ten by his teacher Jackie Cunningham who was a badminton coach of the county, and within 18 months at the age of twelve he made the England team. He also played tennis for the South East region, and he was a football player as well as a 100-metre and 200-metre runner.

Career 
Langridge teamed up with a number of players in the doubles, for example with Peter Mills in the men's doubles, and starting in 2012 with Heather Olver in the mixed doubles. Langridge won three medals at the 2014 Commonwealth Games – a silver in the mixed doubles with Olver, a bronze in the men's doubles with Mills, as well as a silver in the mixed team match. By 2013, he has won three gold medals at the English National Badminton Championships in the men's doubles (with Nathan Robertson in 2011 and Mills 2013) and mixed doubles (with Olver in 2013).

In September 2014, he teamed up with Marcus Ellis. They won the men's doubles title in the English National Badminton Championships in both 2015 and 2016. They won a bronze in the 2016 European Championships in La Roche-sur-Yon.  They have also won medals in the European Team Championships with  a silver in the Mixed Team in 2015, and a bronze medal in the Men's Team in 2016.

At the 2016 Summer Olympics in Rio, despite ranking only No. 22 in the world, Ellis and Langridge managed to win a bronze, the first Olympic medal in badminton men's doubles won by a British team.

At the 2018 Commonwealth Games held on the Gold Coast, Australia, Langridge won a gold in the men's doubles with Marcus Ellis, which is England's first men's badminton double title at the Games in 40 years. He also won a bronze in the mixed team event.

Langridge qualified to represent Great Britain at the 2019 European Games, played in the men's doubles with Marcus Ellis. Competed as the second seed, they managed to claim the gold medal after beat the top seed from Denmark Kim Astrup and Anders Skaarup Rasmussen in straight games 21–17, 21–10.

In October 2020, Langridge and Marcus Ellis won the men's doubles title at the 2020 Denmark Open, became the first English men's doubles pair in 45 years to win the Denmark Open.

Langridge competed at the 2021 European Championships in Kyiv, Ukraine, and won a bronze in the men's doubles with Ellis.

After his deselection from the 2020 Olympics, Langridge retired from international competition. He later became a coach for the French Badminton Team, in 2022.

Personal life 
Langridge is married to Emma Page.

Achievements

Olympic Games 
Men's doubles

Commonwealth Games 
Men's doubles

Mixed doubles

European Games 
Men's doubles

European Championships 
Men's doubles

BWF World Tour (4 titles) 
The BWF World Tour, which was announced on 19 March 2017 and implemented in 2018, is a series of elite badminton tournaments sanctioned by the Badminton World Federation (BWF). The BWF World Tour is divided into levels of World Tour Finals, Super 1000, Super 750, Super 500, Super 300 (part of the HSBC World Tour), and the BWF Tour Super 100.

Men's doubles

BWF Grand Prix (3 runners-up) 
The BWF Grand Prix had two levels, the BWF Grand Prix and Grand Prix Gold. It was a series of badminton tournaments sanctioned by the Badminton World Federation (BWF) which was held from 2007 to 2017.

Men's doubles

Mixed doubles

  BWF Grand Prix Gold tournament
  BWF Grand Prix tournament

BWF International Challenge/Series (17 titles, 11 runners-up) 
Men's doubles

Mixed doubles

  BWF International Challenge tournament
  BWF International Series tournament
  BWF Future Series tournament

References

External links 
 
 
 
 
 
 
 
 

1985 births
Living people
Sportspeople from Epsom
English male badminton players
Olympic badminton players of Great Britain
Badminton players at the 2016 Summer Olympics
Olympic bronze medallists for Great Britain
Olympic medalists in badminton
Medalists at the 2016 Summer Olympics
Badminton players at the 2018 Commonwealth Games
Badminton players at the 2014 Commonwealth Games
Commonwealth Games gold medallists for England
Commonwealth Games silver medallists for England
Commonwealth Games bronze medallists for England
Commonwealth Games medallists in badminton
Badminton players at the 2019 European Games
European Games gold medalists for Great Britain
European Games medalists in badminton
Medallists at the 2014 Commonwealth Games
Medallists at the 2018 Commonwealth Games